Huang Chuang may refer to:
 Huang Suh-chuang, Taiwanese sprinter
 Huang Chuang (footballer), Chinese footballer